Alvan S. Harper (1847–1911) was an American photographer who was active in Tallahassee, Florida. He had a studio and did posed portraits with backdrops, cabinet photos, as well as photographs of residences, buildings, farming, hunting, railway activity, political leaders, and many local people. The Florida State Archives have a collection of his work. The University of Florida published an album of his work including a short biography, explanation of the rediscovery of a set of his glass plates, notations on the images, as well as media accounts of his history and photos. A travelling exhibition of select photographs he took of African Americans has been made into a travelling exhibition by the Museum of Florida.

His work includes photographs of children at play, a young Francis B. Winthrop and his brother Guy Winthrop on horseback with African American attendants alongside.

Harper produced a series of portraits of Florida's early Supreme Court Justices. He based them on earlier images, where he could find them, or photographs he took himself. He retouched the works with charcoal. They were later used to make oil paintings and lost. Some were later rediscovered while many remain missing.

Harper was born in Norristown, Pennsylvania in 1847. He worked as a photographer in Philadelphia before moving to Tallahassee, Florida. The book of his photographs published in 1986 was reviewed in the Southern Historian. In 2017 a "Trolley ride through Alvan S. Harper's Tallassee" was held. Exhibition of a selection of his photographs of African Americans was held at the Wentworth Museum in Pensacola 2016.

Gallery

References

1847 births
1911 deaths
19th-century American photographers
People from Norristown, Pennsylvania
People from Tallahassee, Florida
Photographers from Pennsylvania
Photographers from Florida